A UTI is a urinary tract infection.

UTI may also refer to:
 Uniform Type Identifier,  in Apple software
 Unique Transaction Identifier, in financial trading
 Ultrasound tongue imaging, in phonetics

Companies 
 UTI Asset Management
Unit Trust of India, an Indian mutual fund
 Universal Technical Institute, an American automotive education provider
UTI Holdings, a Romanian holding company

People
 Uti Nwachukwu, Nigerian Big Brother Africa contestant
 Sunday Uti, Nigerian sprinter